Abante is a Filipino tabloid newspaper.

Abante may also refer to:

Abante Viscaya, Filipino political party
3480 Abante, main-belt asteroid

People with the surname
Benny M. Abante (born 1951), Filipino politician

See also
Abantes, ancient Ionian tribe